Pere Riba is the defending champion, but he lost in the final to Albert Ramos-Viñolas 6–3, 3–6, 7–5.

Seeds

Draw

Finals

Top half

Bottom half

References
Main Draw
Qualifying Singles

2010
Singles